The Mozambican Football Federation is the governing body of football in Mozambique. It was founded in 1975, affiliated to FIFA in 1980 and to CAF in 1978. It organizes the national football league Moçambola and the national team.

References

External links
  Federação Moçambicana de Futebol official site (in Portuguese).
 Mozambique at the FIFA website.
  Mozambique at CAF Online

Mozambique
Football in Mozambique
Sports organizations established in 1976